Arthur William Thoms, Jr. (born October 20, 1946) is a former collegiate and professional American football defensive tackle who played nine seasons in the NFL.

Thoms played high school football at Brick Township High School in Brick Township, New Jersey, after transferring from Wayne Valley High School in Wayne, New Jersey, where he played for two seasons.  From there he spent one year in the Hargrave Military Academy, which is where Syracuse Football found him and offered him a full scholarship.

In the 1969 NFL Draft, Thoms was drafted in the First Round out of Syracuse University, New York. He played eight seasons with the Oakland Raiders and was a member of the Super Bowl XI in the 1976.  He then played one season with the Philadelphia Eagles before deciding to retire.

In 2002, Art was inducted to the Syracuse University "All Millennium" Football Team.

Personal life
While still playing football, Art bought coin operated laundromats.  He continued to purchase laundromats after he retired and still owns two today.

He also started a sports memorabilia business, "Art's Sports Artifacts" which provides signed and unsigned memorabilia for charities or personal collectors.  

Art has been married to his wife, Darlene for 44 years and they have been together 49 years.  They have four children, three boys and one daughter.  They currently have nine grandchildren.

After retiring from the NFL, Art coached all four of his children in various sports (football, baseball, basketball, soccer). And several of his grandchildren.

Today, Art and his wife are semi-retired and spend their time with their children and grandchildren.  They are now watching all their grandchildren play sports.  They also spend time traveling.

See also
List of American Football League players

References

1947 births
Living people
American football defensive tackles
American Football League players
Brick Township High School alumni
Oakland Raiders players
People from Teaneck, New Jersey
People from Wayne, New Jersey
Philadelphia Eagles players
Players of American football from New Jersey
Sportspeople from Bergen County, New Jersey
Sportspeople from Brick Township, New Jersey
Sportspeople from Passaic County, New Jersey
Syracuse Orange football players
Wayne Valley High School alumni
Sportspeople from Ocean County, New Jersey
Hargrave Military Academy alumni